The Angels Wash Their Faces is a 1939 Warner Bros. film directed by Ray Enright and starring Ann Sheridan, Ronald Reagan and the Dead End Kids.

Plot

Gabe Ryan is released from reform school and is taken to a new house by his sister Joy to start a new life where no one knows of his past. However, Gabe immediately joins the Beale Street Termites gang, and meets gangster William Kroner, who accuses Gabe of starting a fire at one Kroner's his properties. Alfred Martino, the actual arsonist, uses the opportunity to frame Gabe for other fires. He torches one of his apartment complexes so that he can collect the insurance money, but one of the kids named Sleepy is killed in the fire.

Patrick Remson, the assistant district attorney, tries to prove Gabe's innocence. His motives are not only to prove Gabe's innocence but also to get closer to Gabe's sister. Joy has devoted her life to helping Gabe and neglects her other interests such as rallying against city-government corruption, which pleases Martino. However, Gabe is found guilty and sentenced to prison.

The other boys, led by Billy, try to help Gabe. Billy runs for mayor and wins. He has Kroner arrested for a small infraction and sends him to jail. Billy and the rest of the gang interrogate Kroner and try to force him to admit that Gabe is innocent, but Kroner does not budge until he is shown proof that his accomplices, Martino and the fire chief, are planning to leave the country. He confesses and Martino and the chief are arrested and sent to prison.

Cast

The Dead End Kids
Billy Halop as Billy Shafter
Bobby Jordan as Bernie Smith
Leo Gorcey as Leo Finnegan
Gabriel Dell as Luigi Batteran
Huntz Hall as Huntz Gartman
Bernard Punsly as Luke 'Sleepy' Arkelian

Additional cast
Ann Sheridan as Joy Ryan
Ronald Reagan as Patrick Remson
Bonita Granville as Peggy Finnegan
Frankie Thomas as Gabe Ryan
Margaret Hamilton as Miss Hannaberry
Marjorie Main as Mrs. Arkelian
Grady Sutton as Gildersleeve (mayor's secretary)
Aldrich Bowker as Turnkey
Cy Kendell as Hynes
Henry O'Neil as Ramson Sr.
Eduardo Ciannelli as Martino 
Burton Churchill as Mayor Dooley 
Minor Watson as Maloney
Jackie Searle as Alfred Goonplatz 
Bernard Nedell as Kramer
Dick Rich as Shuffle 
William Hopper as Photographer (uncredited)

Production
The Angels Wash Their Faces was filmed under the title The Battle of the City Hall. It was changed to reference the title of the unrelated film Angels with Dirty Faces, which also starred Ann Sheridan and the Dead End Kids along with James Cagney and Humphrey Bogart and had been released the previous year.

Reception
Variety wrote that although Ray Enright sacrificed "plausibility for action," he had "directed with an eye for the spectacular, including a thrilling fire scene and a dramatic courtroom sequence" and never let "the swift pace ease" while the "screenplay holds no voids in the rapid-fire plot tempo."

Home media
The film was released on DVD by Warner Bros. on November 10, 2010.

References

External links 

 

1939 films
American crime drama films
American black-and-white films
1930s English-language films
1939 crime drama films
Warner Bros. films
Films directed by Ray Enright
Films scored by Adolph Deutsch
1930s American films